Mount Cabuyao (alternatively spelled as Mount Kabuyao) is a mountain in the Philippines located in the municipality of Tuba in the province of Benguet. It is commonly mistaken as Mount Santo Tomas, a taller mountain just beside it.

Due to its high elevation, several communications companies constructed relay stations and radars at the summit. A private observatory and AA radar station, once operated by the US Armed Forces stationed in the country, is also located here. A water catchment area was constructed to supply water to the City of Baguio and nearby towns. A small community of farmers live at the top of the mountain. A town hall and a school was built for them by the local government.

Tourism

Currently, no tourists are allowed to visit here because of the Permanent Environment Protection Order issued by the Court of Appeals on May 5, 2015.

Previously, the two large satellite dishes at its summit have become a landmark for Baguio. The summit is also a good vantage point. During fair weather, one can see the whole City of Baguio to the east and could partially see the province of Pangasinan to the west. On a clear day, one can observe moving cargo ships passing by the South China Sea.

Hikers climb the mountain occasionally for recreational purposes. Biking is also popular.

Forest cover
The mountain forest is part of the protected Mount Santo Tomas watershed, which supplies water to areas near the Ben Palispis Highway and other parts of Tuba. In September 2014, the Supreme Court of the Philippines ordered the temporary ceasing of development projects in a disputed area covering the forest reserve.
 The affected area, which has been heavily deforested, was to be developed into an eco-tourism park, as planned by Baguio Representative Nicasio Aliping Jr.

References

Mountains of the Philippines
Landforms of Benguet